Aenigmaticum californicum is a species of minute hooded beetle in the family Corylophidae. It is found in North America.

References

Further reading

 
 

Corylophidae
Articles created by Qbugbot
Beetles described in 1889